Kahriz-e Olya (also Romanized as Kahrīz-e ‘Olyā) is a village in Howmeh Rural District, in the Central District of Harsin County, Kermanshah Province, Iran. At the 2006 census, its population was 277, in 57 families.

References 

Populated places in Harsin County